Cape Felt is an ice-covered cape which marks the north end of Wright Island, on the Bakutis Coast of Marie Byrd Land, Antarctica. It was first mapped from air photos taken by U.S. Navy Operation Highjump in January 1947, and was named by the Advisory Committee on Antarctic Names after Admiral Harry D. Felt, U.S. Navy, Vice Chief of Naval Operations in the post 1957–58 International Geophysical Year period.

References 

Headlands of Marie Byrd Land